Frances Barkley was wife of Captain Charles William Barkley, who traveled with him. She is considered to be the first European woman to have ever visited Canada's west coast. Frances was the first woman to sail around the world without deception. Only two women are known to have sailed around the world before Frances: Jeanne Baré, disguised as a man, and Rose de Freycinet, wife of Louis de Freycinet, as a stowaway.

References

1759 births
1832 deaths
Circumnavigators of the globe
English explorers
English sailors
Explorers of British Columbia
English explorers of North America
English explorers of the Pacific